The Leach Public Library in Wahpeton, North Dakota was built in 1923. It was listed on the National Register of Historic Places in 1990.

It was funded by Orrin Leach, who also served as Wahpeton's mayor.  When his initial $25,000 contribution proved inadequate, he gave more funds.

Fargo architects Keith & Kurke provided the design.

References

Library buildings completed in 1923
Neoclassical architecture in North Dakota
Libraries on the National Register of Historic Places in North Dakota
Public libraries in North Dakota
National Register of Historic Places in Richland County, North Dakota
1923 establishments in North Dakota
Wahpeton, North Dakota